Wojsławice  is a village in Chełm County, Lublin Voivodeship, in eastern Poland. It is the seat of the gmina (administrative district) called Gmina Wojsławice.

The village has an approximate population of 1,600.

The village is a common setting of many literary works by Polish writer Andrzej Pilipiuk, in particular, related to his fictional character Jakub Wędrowycz, who lives in the nearby village of Stary Majdan. Since 2006, an annual fandom convention dedicated to has been taking place in Wojsławice, and a 3-meter tall wooden statue of the character has been raised in 2013.

References

Villages in Chełm County
Ruthenian Voivodeship
Kholm Governorate
Lublin Voivodeship (1919–1939)